Magic Lantern is a 1944 historical novel by Lady Eleanor Smith, her final novel before her death the next year. In it a Devon squire marries an attractive gypsy girl with whom he has a son; he in turn becomes besotted with a gypsy woman on the moors.

References

Bibliography
 Vinson, James. Twentieth-Century Romance and Gothic Writers. Macmillan, 1982.

1944 British novels
Novels by Lady Eleanor Smith
British romance novels
British historical novels
Novels set in Devon
Novels set in the 19th century
Hutchinson (publisher) books